East Central University (ECU or East Central) is a public university in Ada, Oklahoma. It is part of Oklahoma's Regional University System. Beyond its flagship campus in Ada, the university has courses available in McAlester, Shawnee, and Durant, as well as online courses. Founded as East Central State Normal School in 1909, its present name was adopted in 1985. Some of its more prominent alumni include former Microsoft COO B. Kevin Turner, Modernist painter Leon Polk Smith, former NFL player Mark Gastineau, past governors Robert S. Kerr and George Nigh, former U.S. Representative Lyle Boren, Oklahoma Supreme Court Justice Tom Colbert, and U.S. Army General James D. Thurman.

History
The university was founded as East Central State Normal School in 1909, two years after Oklahoma was admitted as the 46th U.S. state. It was one of the six newly created state funded normal schools that were designed to provide four years of "preparatory" (or high school) study, followed by two years of college work towards teacher certification. The school's establishment was the product of the intense lobbying efforts of the 25,000 Club, a local booster group. The club raised funds for faculty salaries so classes could begin that fall in local churches and public school classrooms. Graduates of the normal school program received lifetime teaching certification statewide. The 1910 Oklahoma Legislature funded faculty salaries and the construction of a building on a  site donated by a Chickasaw allottee. In 1919, the normal schools were authorized by the Oklahoma Legislature to offer four years of teacher education, to offer bachelor's degrees, and were designated teachers' colleges.

Expanding beyond education degrees, in 1939 the school became East Central State College. Fifteen years later, the regional colleges were allowed to offer graduate degrees. By 1974, the state legislature renamed the state colleges, and it became East Central Oklahoma State University—a name it retained until 1985 when it gained its present name.

Academics
ECU serves around 4,000 students and is perhaps best known for its Environmental Health Science Program, one of only 30 programs nationally accredited by the National Environmental Health Science and Protection Accreditation Council

East Central is divided into 5 academic units (three colleges and two schools) with 70 degree programs. They are:

 College of Education and Psychology
 College of Health and Sciences
School of Nursing
 College of Liberal Arts and Social Sciences
School of Fine Arts
The Harland C. Stonecipher School of Business
 School of Graduate Studies

Other campuses
East Central is no longer one of four participating institutions offering courses at the Ardmore Higher Education Center. There are Distance Education sites located in Shawnee, OK, through the Gordon Cooper Technology Center and McAlester, OK through the Eastern Oklahoma State College. ECU offers online graduate and undergraduate courses.

Student life 
East Central hosts nearly eighty student organizations. Among them are a local chapter of Alpha Psi Omega and Pi Kappa Delta as well as the Student Government Association and Campus Activity Board. In addition, there are five Greek organizations at ECU divided among the Interfraternity Council (IFC) and Panhellenic Association (PHA):

Chi Omega Phi Theta Chapter Est. December 12, 1964
Zeta Tau Alpha Zeta Theta Chapter Est. April 16, 1966
Phi Kappa Tau - Gamma Xi Chapter - Est. April 15, 1966
Pi Kappa Alpha - Epsilon Omega Chapter - Est. October 25, 1963
Sigma Tau Gamma Tau Chapter Est. 1938

Athletics

East Central's athletic teams (the "Tigers") have competed in the NCAA Division II Great American Conference (GAC) since 2011, after competing in the Lone Star Conference of the NCAA from 1997 to 2011. The university hosts 11 sports, 5 men's athletic programs and 6 programs for women. The school's football team won the NAIA national football championship in 1993. Athletics offices are located within the Kerr Activities Center.

Notable alumni

Politics

ECU has had several graduates move to political office, including five of alumni who were elected to the position of governor.
 Bill Anoatubby, Chickasaw Nation Governor
 Charles W. Blackwell (Class of 1964), first Ambassador of the Chickasaw Nation to the United States from 1995 until 2013.
 Lyle Boren, former U.S. Congressman
 Cindy Byrd, Oklahoma State Auditor and Inspector
 Tom Colbert, Oklahoma Supreme Court Justice
 Frank W. Davis (Oklahoma politician) (Class of 1958), late member of the Oklahoma House of Representatives
 Robert S. Kerr, former Governor of the State of Oklahoma, and U.S. Senator
 Ernest McFarland, former Arizona Governor
 George Nigh, former Governor of the State of Oklahoma

Professional sports

Several ECU grads have excelled in the area of professional sports:

 Harry "The Cat" Brecheen, former baseball player
 Armonty Bryant, former professional football player
 Brad Calip, College Football Hall of Fame football player
 Mark Gastineau, former professional football player
 Todd Graham, former Arizona State Sun Devils Head Football Coach
 Dewey McClain, football player
 David Moore, Chicago Bears wide receiver
 Trinity Benson, Detroit Lions wide receiver
 Caleb Holley, Canadian Football League wide receiver
 Dr. Gil Morgan, professional golfer
 Clifford Thrift, former San Diego Chargers, Chicago Bears and Los Angeles Rams professional football player
 Jerry Walker, former major league baseball player and front-office executive
 Lloyd Waner, baseball hall-of-famer
 Paul Waner, baseball hall-of-famer

Other notable alumni

 Wade Burleson, author, historian, and teacher
Jeremy Castle, singer songwriter
 Hallie Brown Ford, philanthropist
 Aaron Gwyn, professor and author
 Kenneth Hite, professional author and game designer
 Jennifer McLoud-Mann, mathematician
 Leon Polk Smith, Artist
 Harland Stonecipher, Pre-Paid Legal Services, Inc. Founder, Chairman & CEO
 B. Kevin Turner, Former COO of Microsoft, CEO of Sam's Club and CIO of Walmart
 La Vern E. Weber, United States Army Lieutenant General and Chief of the National Guard Bureau

References

External links
 
 Official athletics website

 
Educational institutions established in 1909
Public universities and colleges in Oklahoma
School buildings on the National Register of Historic Places in Oklahoma
Education in Pontotoc County, Oklahoma
Buildings and structures in Pontotoc County, Oklahoma
Ada, Oklahoma
1909 establishments in Oklahoma
National Register of Historic Places in Pontotoc County, Oklahoma